Bézancourt is a commune in the Seine-Maritime department in the Normandy region in northern France.

Geography

Population

Places of interest
 The church of St. Aubin, dating from the sixteenth century.
 A menhir called the “Pierre-qui-Tourne” (turning stone).
 A château dating from the seventeenth century.
 The château du Landel.

See also
Communes of the Seine-Maritime department

References

Communes of Seine-Maritime